Homosexuality in ancient Egypt is a disputed subject within Egyptology. Historians and egyptologists alike debate what kinds of views the ancient Egyptians' society fostered about homosexuality. Only a handful of direct clues survive, and many possible indications are vague and subject to speculation.

Depictions of possible homosexuality

Nyankh-khnum and Khnum-hotep
The best known case of possible homosexuality in ancient Egypt is that of the two high officials Nyankh-Khnum and Khnum-hotep. Both men lived and served under pharaoh Niuserre during the 5th Dynasty (c. 2494–2345 BC). Nyankh-Khnum and Khnum-hotep each had families of their own with children and wives, but when they died their families apparently decided to bury them together in the same mastaba tomb. In this mastaba, several paintings depict both men embracing each other and touching their faces nose-on-nose. These depictions leave plenty of room for speculation, because in ancient Egypt the nose-on-nose touching normally represented a kiss.

Egyptologists and historians disagree about how to interpret the paintings of Nyankh-khnum and Khnum-hotep. Some scholars believe that the paintings reflect an example of homosexuality between two married men and prove that the ancient Egyptians accepted same-sex relationships. Other scholars disagree and interpret the scenes as an evidence that Nyankh-khnum and Khnum-hotep were twins, or even possibly conjoined twins. No matter what interpretation is correct, the paintings show at the very least that Nyankh-khnum and Khnum-hotep must have been very close to each other in life as in death.

King Pepi II and his general officer Sasenet

A well known story, dating back to the Middle Kingdom, tells about an anonymous citizen, who comes to the audience hall of king Pepi II (here named by his birth name, Neferkarê). The citizen wants to lament about an unnamed circumstance, but the king does not want to listen to the laments, so he orders his royal musicians to drown the stranger's speech with noise. Disappointed, the stranger leaves the palace. When this happens several times, he orders his friend, the high official Tjeti, to follow the king. The king in turn is frequently leaving the palace during the night. Tjeti finds out that king Pepi II keeps visiting his loyal general officer Sasenet for several hours, then returning home.

The chapter in which king Pepi II visits his loyal general officer is subject of passionate discussions. Especially one certain phrase stays in the centre of investigations: the text says, that "his majesty went into Sasenet's house and did to him what his majesty desired". The phrase "doing what one desires" is a common flowery phrase to describe sex. For this reason, some scholars are convinced that the papyrus reveals king Pepi's homosexual interests and his same-sex relationship with his general officer. But other scholars are instead convinced that the passage is merely an allegoric pun to religious texts, in which the sun god Râ visits the underworld god Osiris during the middle four hours of the night. Thus, king Pepi II would be taking the role of Râ and Sasenet would take the role of Osiris. The phrase "doing what one desires" would therefore be overrated and misinterpreted.

Horus and Seth
A further famous story about same-sex intercourse can be found in the Kahun Papyri, dating back to the Middle Kingdom. It contains the nearly completely preserved story of the Osiris myth and the legendary fight for the throne of Egypt between Horus and Seth. The chapter in question reports that Seth was unutterably jealous about his young nephew Horus, because Horus was very young and popular. He was quite pampered by the other gods. Seth instead had very few companions and he was comparatively unpopular because of his choleric and vindictive behaviour. As a result, Seth tried to either chase away or even kill Horus, no matter what the cost. When Seth constantly fails, he plans to humiliate his rival so badly that Horus would be banned from Egypt forever. Seth invites Horus to a party and convinces the teenage Horus to drink more than Horus could normally cope with. When Horus is drunk, Seth seduces him to sleep over the night in one bed together. When lying together in one bed, Seth grabs Horus and rapes him. But Horus has tricked Seth; his drunkenness was staged. He catches Seth's semen with his hands and hides it. The next morning, Horus runs to his Mother, Isis, to tell her what happened. Isis is at first speechless with rage and disbelief, then she tells Horus to masturbate and use his semen to lubricate Seth's favorite food (Egyptian lettuce). Oblivious, Seth eats the manipulated lettuce, then he goes to the divine court to inform on Horus. At first, the divine judges swear at Horus, but when Thoth, the scribe of the court, calls for Seth's semen to emerge from the body of Horus, instead the semen of Horus emerges from the body of Seth. Seth blushes in embarrassment and shock, then flees. Horus is acquitted.

The famous rape of Horus by his jealous uncle is also a subject of passionate discussion. While most scholars agree that the papyrus clearly describes rape, it must remain open, whether it actually describes a homosexually driven deed. Background of the dispute are Seth's motives: he does not love Horus; in contrast, he hates his nephew and the rape was clearly performed to humiliate Horus. The only common ground between the rape and homosexuality is that the act was of same-sex nature. But some scholars are not so sure and point out that Seth was often credited with alternative sexual interests.

Others 
Two military men named Ramose and Wepimose or Wepwawetrnose who dedicated Salakhana Stela CM004 might have been a couple.

Suty and Hor who are known of the famous stela, often regarded as a locus classicus of twins, could have been a male couple.

At Sheikh Fadl, there is a tomb dating to the 6th or 5th Century BCE with an Aramaic inscription apparently written by one member of a male couple to another, in which the speaker says "I cannot abandon him, I shall rest with him; I love Lekii (personal name?) very much."

Ancient Egyptian views 
It remains unclear what exact view the ancient Egyptians fostered about homosexuality. Any documents, or literature that contain stories involving sexual acts never name the nature of the sexual deeds but instead use flowery and euphemistic paraphrases. While the stories about Seth and his sexual behavior may reveal rather negative thoughts and views, the tomb inscription of Nyankh-khnum and Khnum-hotep may instead suggest that homosexuality was likewise accepted. Ancient Egyptian documents never clearly say that same-sex relationships were seen as reprehensible or despicable. No ancient Egyptian document mentions that homosexual acts were punishable offenses. Thus, a direct evaluation remains problematic.

Talmudic literature 
In Talmudic literature, the ancient Egyptians are known for their liberal sexual lifestyles and are often used as the prime example of sexual debauchery. Rashi, who lived in the 11th Century CE, describes an Egyptian practice for women to have multiple husbands. Maimonides refers to lesbianism as "the acts of Egypt." While polyandry and lesbianism are characteristics of the ancient Egyptians according to religious Jewish discourse, male-male homosexual relationships are usually attributed to Sodom, Gomorrah, and Amalek.

See also
Ashmolean Parchment AN 1981.940, a Coptic male homosexual love charm written in Hermopolitan dialect
Timeline of LGBT history (lesbian, gay, bisexual, transgender related history)

References

Further reading

Ancient Egyptian society
Egypt
LGBT in Egypt
LGBT history in Africa